Shijia is a name in the Chinese language and may refer to:

People
 Wang Shijia (Shījiā), swimmer from China
 Gong Shijia (Shījiā), singer from Singapore
 Ding Shijia (Shìjiā), entrepreneur from China

Concepts
 Shakya (Shìjiā), ancient tribe
 Sakyamuni (Shìjiā), name for the Buddha